Cybocephalidae is a family of sap, bark and fungus beetles in the order Coleoptera with a wide global distribution. The type genus Cybocephalus has more than 200 species in it and the entire family has about 220 species in all. Many species are predators of armoured scale insects (Diaspididae). There are four tarsal segments on all the legs. The body is only slightly longer than wide and very convex and shiny. They are small and about 1 to 3 mm long. The insect can roll into a ball like position with its downward facing head. The tarsomeres are lobed underneath. The family is sometimes treated as a subfamily within the Nitudulidae.

Genera 
Cybocephalidae contains the following genera:
 Amedissia Kirejtshuk & Mantič, 2015 – Central and South America
 Apastillus Kirejtshuk & Mantič, 2015 – Japan
 Conglobatus T. R. Smith, 2020 – Central America, South America and the West Indies.
 Cybocephalus Erichson, 1844 – Worldwide
 Endrodiellus Enrödy-Younga, 1962 – Madagascar
 Eupastillus Lawrence, 2019 – Australia
 Hierronius Enrödy-Younga, 1968 – Madeira and Canary Islands
 Horadion Enrödy-Younga, 1976 – Eastern Africa and southern Asia
 Microthomas T. R. Smith, 2020 – Bolivia
 Pacicephalus Kirejtshuk & Mantič, 2015 – Micronesia
 †Pastillocenicus Kirejtshuk & Nel, 2008 – French Eocene amber
 Pastillodes Enrödy-Younga, 1968 – Northern Africa
 Pastillus Enrödy-Younga, 1962 – Tropical and southern Africa
 Pycnocephalus Sharp, 1891 – Mexico, Central America and South America
 Taxicephomerus Kirejtshuk, 1994 – Vietnam
 Theticephalus Kirejtshuk, 1988 – Northern Africa, Middle East and Central Asia

References

Further reading

 
 
 
 
 
 
 
 
 
 
 

Cucujoidea
Cucujoidea families